In public transport, Route 6 may refer to:

Route 6 (MTA Maryland), a bus route in Baltimore, Maryland
Barcelona Metro line 6
London Buses route 6
Line 6 (Madrid Metro)
Melbourne tram route 6
6 (New York City Subway service)
Seoul Subway Line 6
Shanghai Metro Line 6

See also 
 Line 6 (disambiguation)

6